Out of the Blue is an American fantasy sitcom that aired on ABC during the fall of 1979. It is chiefly notable as having featured a Mork & Mindy crossover, and for the debate surrounding its status as a spin-off of Happy Days.

Production
The series starred Jimmy Brogan as Random, an angel-in-training who is assigned to live with (and act as guardian angel for) a suburban Chicago family (led by a single mom played by Dixie Carter), as well as work as a high school teacher. The series debuted on September 9, 1979, but it got poor ratings against 60 Minutes on CBS (the #1 show on TV that year) and Disney on NBC. With only seven episodes aired, ABC pulled Blue, as well as fellow freshman sitcom A New Kind of Family, after their October 21 airings. Five more episodes were produced, but only one ever aired on ABC (on December 16) before Out of the Blue was canceled.

Spin-off debate
Out of the Blue has engendered debate amongst some viewers concerning its precise relationship to Happy Days. The controversy arises from the fact that the first episode of the series was broadcast a little over one week prior to an episode of Happy Days featuring Jimmy Brogan as the character Random. Television observer and owner of Sitcoms Online, Todd Fuller, maintains that because "Chachi Sells His Soul" aired on September 18, 1979, Random's appearance on this Happy Days episode was a crossover. He goes on to postulate: "The Happy Days episode was likely a promotional tool for Out of the Blue to make the character more known."

Thom Holbrook, who has a website devoted to TV crossovers and spin-offs, sees the arguments against calling it a spin-off, but ultimately concludes: "Making it a crossover would be basing things all on an odd bit of scheduling decades ago. The intent was spin off. The tone of the Happy Days episode is that of a dry run on the character, that of a pilot episode."

Cast list
 Jimmy Brogan as Random
 Dixie Carter as Aunt Marion
 Clark Brandon as Chris Richards
 Olivia Barash as Laura Richards
 Tammy Lauren as Stacey Richards
 Jason Keller as Jason Richards
 Shane Keller as Shane Richards
 Hannah Dean as Gladys
 Eileen Heckart as The Boss Angel

Guest stars 
 Robin Williams as Mork from Ork
 Tim Conway as Wally Richards

Episodes

References

External links
 
 Series intro at RetroJunk 
 

1979 American television series debuts
1979 American television series endings
1970s American sitcoms
American Broadcasting Company original programming
American television spin-offs
American fantasy television series
English-language television shows
Happy Days
Television shows set in Chicago
Television series by CBS Studios
Religious comedy television series
Angels in television